St. Melyd Golf Links railway station was a stop on Dyserth branch line (now a footpath). Passengers would have to access from the Gwaenysgor facing side of the golf course. All that remains here is a post that has long overgrown with foliage. This post was probably used to bear the station name.

The branch line to Dyserth was opened by the LNWR in 1869, initially for mineral traffic only. A passenger service was instituted in 1905 but lasted only until 1930, when it was withdrawn by the LMS. The line remained open to serve a quarry at Dyserth until complete closure in 1973.

References

Sources

Disused railway stations in Denbighshire
Former London, Midland and Scottish Railway stations
Railway stations in Great Britain opened in 1923
Railway stations in Great Britain closed in 1930